The 21st Regiment, Mississippi Infantry was a Confederate infantry regiment from Mississippi in the American Civil War. The regiment was involved in several well documented battles including the battles of Antietam, Chancellorsville, Gettysburg and Chickamauga.

Commanders
Colonel William L. Brandon
Colonel Benjamin G. Humphreys

See also
List of Mississippi Civil War Confederate units

References

Units and formations of the Confederate States Army from Mississippi